The Charles Whittingham Stakes is a Grade II American Thoroughbred horse race for horses age three years old and older over a distance of  miles on the turf held annually in late May at Santa Anita Park in Arcadia, California, USA.  The event currently carries a purse of $225,000.

History 

The event was inaugurated in 1969 as the Hollywood Invitational Handicap over a distance of  miles on the turf.

The event was run at a distance of a  miles from 1969 to 1987 and recently 2015.
From 1989 until 1998, the race was named the Hollywood Turf Handicap. 

In 1999 the event was renamed to Charles Whittingham Handicap and in 2003 to Charles Whittingham Memorial Handicap in honor of the U.S. Racing Hall of Fame trainer Charlie Whittingham (1913–1999) who saddled many memorable winners at Hollywood Park and whose seven victories in the Hollywood Invitational Turf Handicap race was the most for any trainer. It had been equaled since.

In 2014 when Hollywood Park Racetrack closed the race was moved to Santa Anita Park and renamed to it current name. 

Originally a Grade I event, the event was downgraded in 2013 to Grade II.

Records
Time record: (at current distance of  miles)
 1:57.75 - Bien Bien (1993) 

Most wins:
 3 - Acclamation (2010, 2011, 2012)
 3 - John Henry (1980, 1981, 1984)

Most wins by an owner:
 3 - Dotsam Stable (1980, 1981, 1984)

Most wins by a jockey:
 6 - Gary Stevens (1991, 1992, 1994, 2003, 2015, 2017)

Most wins by a trainer:
 7 - Charles Whittingham (1970, 1971, 1976, 1978, 1982, 1983, 1987)
 7 - Neil Drysdale (1985, 1988, 2000, 2003, 2006, 2008, 2014)
 7 - Robert J. Frankel (1973, 1979, 1991, 1992, 1999, 2002, 2009)

Winners

Notes:

¶ Mare

References

 The 2008 Charles Whittingham Memorial Handicap at the NTRA

Graded stakes races in the United States
Open middle distance horse races
Horse races in California
Turf races in the United States
Recurring sporting events established in 1969
Santa Anita Park
1969 establishments in California